Chris Caputo (born July 22, 1980) is an American basketball coach who is the current head coach of the George Washington Colonials men's basketball team.

Playing career
Caputo played four years of basketball at Westfield State, where he served as team captain.

Coaching career
After graduation, Caputo joined Jim Larrañaga's coaching staff at George Mason as the director of operations and video coordinator. He'd become a full assistant coach in 2005, where that year, the Patriots would reach the 2006 Final Four. While on staff at George Mason, the team would reach the NCAA tournament three times, along with the NIT once. 

When Larrañaga accepted the head coaching position at Miami in 2011, Caputo would join him on staff where he be a part of the Hurricanes' 2013 ACC regular season and tournament titles en route to a Sweet 16 appearance in the 2013 NCAA tournament. Caputo would be on staff for five postseason appearances, including runner-up in the 2015 NIT, along with five total NCAA Tournament appearances, including the Elite Eight in 2022.

On April 1, 2022, Caputo was named the head coach at George Washington, replacing Jamion Christian.

References

Living people
1980 births
American men's basketball coaches
George Washington Colonials men's basketball coaches
Miami Hurricanes men's basketball coaches
George Mason Patriots men's basketball coaches
Westfield State Owls men's basketball players
Basketball players from New York City
People from Elmhurst, Queens